Fourteen ships of the Royal Navy have borne the name Kingfisher (or King's Fisher), after the kingfisher bird:

 Kingfisher was a ship in service between 1664 and 1667.
  was a 46-gun fourth-rate ship of the line built in 1675, rebuilt in 1699 and broken up in 1728.
 Kingfisher was a 4-gun ketch purchased in 1684 and captured by the French in 1690.
  (or Kings Fisher) was a 14-gun sloop launched at Gosport. She was converted into an 8-gun bomb vessel and served as such between 1758 and 1760.  She was sold in 1763.
  was a 14-gun sloop launched in 1770 and burnt to avoid capture in 1778.
  was an 18-gun brig-sloop launched in 1782, having been purchased in the stocks. She was wrecked in 1798.
  was an 18-gun sloop launched in 1804 and broken up in 1816.
  was a 10-gun  launched in 1823 that became a Post Office Packet Service packet, sailing out of Falmouth, Cornwall. She was sold in 1838.
  was a 12-gun brig launched in 1845.  She was laid up in 1852, and was then on harbour service from 1875.  She was sold in 1890.
  was an  launched in 1879.  She became a training ship and was renamed HMS Lark in 1892, and then HMS Cruizer in 1893.  She was sold in 1919.
She was renamed HMS Kingfisher in 1890, when she became a training brig. She was sold in 1907.
 HMS Kingfisher was to have been a river gunboat.  She was ordered in 1912, but was subsequently cancelled.

  was a  launched in 1935 and sold in 1947.
  was a  previously HMS King Salvor renamed  in 1954 and in service until 1960 when she was sold to the Argentine Navy.
  was a  launched in 1974 and sold in 1996.

See also
 , a brig listed in service between 1807 and 1814.
 , a naval trawler equipped with a floatplane during the Battle of Jutland. 

Royal Navy ship names